Yevgeny Kafelnikov was the defending champion but lost in the first round to Mikael Tillström.

Todd Woodbridge won in the final 6–2, 6–1 against Scott Draper.

Seeds

  Yevgeny Kafelnikov (first round)
  Mark Woodforde (second round)
  Andriy Medvedev (first round)
  Todd Woodbridge (champion)
  Alex O'Brien (quarterfinals)
  David Prinosil (second round)
  Renzo Furlan (first round)
  Bohdan Ulihrach (second round)

Draw

Finals

Top half

Bottom half

References
 1997 Australian Men's Hardcourt Championships Draw

Next Generation Adelaide International
1997 ATP Tour
1997 in Australian tennis